TEDxAmsterdam is an independent TEDx-licensed event, held annually in Amsterdam, the Netherlands since 2009. The event was founded by Dutch tech-entrepreneur Jim Stolze.

Past events and speakers

2009 — Breakthrough 
The first edition was held in 2009, with the theme "Breakthrough". In 2010, the official book published for this event won gold at the European Design Awards in 2010.

2014 — Somewhere in Time 
The sixth edition was held in 2014 with the theme "Somewhere in Time".

Speakers included:
 Kris Berry

References

External links 
 

Culture in Amsterdam
Organisations based in Amsterdam
Amsterdam